Huron Glacier is a } long and  wide glacial flow on Livingston Island in the South Shetland Islands of Antarctica, situated east of Perunika Glacier, southeast of Kaliakra Glacier, south of Struma Glacier, west-northwest of Iskar Glacier and northeast of Huntress Glacier. It is bounded by Bowles Ridge to the north, Wörner Gap to the west and the Tangra Mountains to the south, receiving ice influx from several tributary glaciers draining the mountain's northern slopes between Mount Friesland and Helmet Peak, and running east-northeastwards to empty into Moon Bay north of Yana Point. Camp Academia is situated on upper Huron Glacier, in the northwestern foothills of Zograf Peak.

The glacier was named by the UK Antarctic Place-names Committee in 1958 after the American ship Huron (Captain John Davis) of New Haven, Connecticut, which visited the South Shetland Islands in 1820–21 and 1821–22.

Location

See also
 List of glaciers in the Antarctic
 Glaciology
 Camp Academia
 Tangra 2004/05

Maps
 L.L. Ivanov et al. Antarctica: Livingston Island and Greenwich Island, South Shetland Islands. Scale 1:100000 topographic map. Sofia: Antarctic Place-names Commission of Bulgaria, 2005.
 L.L. Ivanov. Antarctica: Livingston Island and Greenwich, Robert, Snow and Smith Islands. Scale 1:120000 topographic map.  Troyan: Manfred Wörner Foundation, 2009.  
 A. Kamburov and L. Ivanov. Bowles Ridge and Central Tangra Mountains: Livingston Island, Antarctica. Scale 1:25000 map. Sofia: Manfred Wörner Foundation, 2023.

References

Glaciers of Livingston Island